Thamer Al-Meshauqeh (born 22 April 1991) is a Saudi Arabian professional footballer who plays as a forward.

Career
Al-Meshauqeh started his career at Al-Taawon and is a product of the Al-Taawoun's youth system. On 2 September 2012, Al-Meshauqeh made his professional debut for Al-Taawoun against Al-Raed in the Pro League, replacing Yassin Hamzah . He then played with Al-Asyah, and Al-Bukayriyah.

Career statistics

Club

References

External links 
 

1991 births
Living people
People from Buraidah
Saudi Arabian footballers
Al-Taawoun FC players
Al-Asyah Club players
Al-Bukayriyah FC players
Saudi Professional League players
Saudi Second Division players
Saudi Fourth Division players
Association football forwards